Franck Leopold Essomba Tchoungui (born 9 February 1987) is a Cameroonian professional footballer who plays as a midfielder.

Career

Club
Essomba was born in Douala, Cameroon.

In summer 2010, he joined Polish club Jagiellonia Białystok on a one-year contract. After 2009–10 season, he was a free agent.

The last club he played for was FC Mulhouse in the Championnat National 2.

References

External links
 
 
 

1987 births
Living people
Cameroonian footballers
Cameroonian expatriate footballers
Association football midfielders
Union Douala players
US Bitam players
Jagiellonia Białystok players
CA Bordj Bou Arréridj players
ES Beni-Khalled players
Olympique Béja players
AS Poissy players
FC Versailles 78 players
US Roye-Noyon players
FC Mulhouse players
Championnat National 2 players
Championnat National 3 players
Ekstraklasa players
Tunisian Ligue Professionnelle 1 players
Algerian Ligue Professionnelle 1 players
Expatriate footballers in Poland
Expatriate footballers in Gabon
Expatriate footballers in Algeria
Expatriate footballers in Tunisia
Expatriate footballers in France
Cameroonian expatriate sportspeople in Poland
Cameroonian expatriate sportspeople in Gabon
Cameroonian expatriate sportspeople in Algeria
Cameroonian expatriate sportspeople in Tunisia
Cameroonian expatriate sportspeople in France